This is a list of Danish television related events from 1990.

Events
24 March - Lonnie Devantier is selected to represent Denmark at the 1990 Eurovision Song Contest with her song "Hallo Hallo". She is selected to be the twenty-third Danish Eurovision entry during Dansk Melodi Grand Prix held at the Tivolis Koncertsal in Copenhagen.
30 September - TV3 Denmark is separated from the earlier Pan-Scandinavian version of the channel.

Debuts

Television shows

Births
6 July - Besir Zeciri, Albanian-born actor

Deaths

See also
1990 in Denmark

References